Children's Songs for Peace and a Better World is the album released by the non-profit organization called The Mosaic Project. The organization's co-director is Brett Dennen, the folk musician, who wrote and performed the majority of the songs on the album.

Track listing
All songs were written by Brett Dennen and Lara Mendel and performed by Brett Dennen, except where noted.

"The Mosaic Project Theme Song" - 3:45
"Empathy Song" - 3:00
"If I Were an ET" - 2:31
"It's Alright to Cry" (Carol Hall) - 1:59
"Don't Laugh at Me" (Steve Seskin and Allen Shamblin) - 3:37
"Fighting Is Not the Solution" - 3:01
"Dance and Be Free" - 2:58
"Amani (Serian's Song)" (Serian Leti Strauss) - 2:16
"Paz" - 1:59
"Salaam" (Mosh Ben Ari) - 2:46
"We Are the Mosaic" - 3:14

References

External links
The Mosaic Project: Children's Songs for Peace and a Better World

2003 albums
Brett Dennen albums
Children's music albums by American artists